A referendum on joining NATO was held in Hungary on 16 November 1997. The proposal was approved by 85.3% of voters, with a voter turnout of 49.2%.

Results

References

Notes

1997 referendums
1997 in Hungary
NATO membership
Hungary and NATO
NATO membership referendums